Třebeň is a municipality and village in Cheb District in the Karlovy Vary Region of the Czech Republic. It has about 400 inhabitants.

Administrative parts
Villages and hamlets of Chocovice, Doubí, Dvorek, Horní Ves, Lesina, Lesinka, Nový Drahov, Povodí and Vokov are administrative parts of Třebeň.

History
The first written mention of Třebeň is from 1208.

Gallery

References

External links

Villages in Cheb District